The Former Consulate-General of the United Kingdom (英国驻上海总领事馆) building located in Shanghai, China, is one of the oldest buildings on the Bund.

It is housed in a compound that housed a number of buildings used by the British Consulate-General.  The building served as the home of the Consulate-General and British Supreme Court for China until 8 December 1941 when the Japanese occupied the Shanghai International Settlement at the beginning of the Pacific War.  The British Supreme Court for China was abolished under the British–Chinese Treaty for the Relinquishment of Extra-Territorial Rights in China.   After the war, the Consulate-General returned to the site and remained until 1949 when Britain withdrew its consular staff with the communist occupation of Shanghai.  The consulate re-opened in 1954 and was closed again in 1967 during the Cultural Revolution.

Buildings

The main building on the site appears to be one building but is in fact two buildings.  The building that can be seen from the Bund is the former offices of the Consulate-General of the United Kingdom, and the offices of the British Supreme Court for China and Japan. The building and entrance that can be seen from Yuanmingyuan Road is the former court building of the British Supreme Court for China and Japan.  The main court was located on the second floor of this building.  

Also located at the Northern end of the consular compound is the former residence of the British consul-general. To the west of this is the old Union Church.

Construction

The Supreme Court building was completed in 1871 and the Consulate Office building, built in the Renaissance Revival, was completed in 1873. The later building replaced the previous consulate building that burnt down on 28 December 1870. The Supreme Court building was extended in 1913 to add wings on the north and south to house new courts (south wing) and consular offices (north wing).

As the new Consulate was being built the North China Herald of 1 June 1872 reported on a foundation stone laying ceremony and described the building and offices :

According to the same article, the foundation stone that was laid read:

Post-consulate use

In the early 1980s the compound was used as the site of the Friendship Store, a store for foreign tourists to buy Chinese products.   The Friendship Store was located in the former Assistant Judge's House.  A new building was built at the southern end of the compound and opened in later 1985.

The compound then became the offices of various Shanghai government bodies.  During the 1990s the building was abandoned and became very dilapidated.   In the mid-2000s, the Shanghai government commenced a project to revitalize the Yuanmingyuan Road area, including the consulate.   The project included tearing down both the old Assistant Judge's house and the Friendship Store built in 1985.

The compound has now been fully restored under the name 33 Waitanyuan, and converted to an entertainment and dining venue managed by Hong Kong and Shanghai Hotels Group's 50% owned Shanghai Peninsula Hotel.  It is now used for functions.

Photographs of the restored buildings (and some of the rooms pre-restoration) may be found online.

A plaque on the Yuanmingyuan Road entrance describes the compound and buildings as follows:

See also 

 List of Consuls-General of the United Kingdom in Shanghai
 British Supreme Court for China

References 

Buildings and structures in Shanghai
China–United Kingdom relations
United Kingdom
Shanghai
Renaissance Revival architecture
Shanghai International Settlement
The Bund